Kyle Emmitt Fuller (born March 4, 1994) is an American football center for the Seattle Seahawks of the National Football League (NFL). He was drafted by the Houston Texans in the seventh round of the 2017 NFL Draft. He played college football at Baylor.

High school career
Fuller was a consensus state top 100 offensive line recruit for Wylie (Texas) High School under head coach Bill Howard. Among all offensive linemen, Fuller was ranked No. 37 by ESPN.com, No. 44 by Rivals.com, No. 53 by Scout.com, and No. 57 by 247Sports.com. He was named to the 2011 second-team DFW Class 4A All-Area, and earned 2011 first-team All-District 10-4A honors.

College career
Fuller was a three-year starting center with All-Big 12 honors. He played in 52 career games (most on team) with 39 career starts (most on squad). He anchored an offensive line for nation's most productive offense in 2014–15. He became a key cog in paving the way for BU's rushing attack that led the Big 12 in 2015 and 2016, while helping Bears rank fourth or better in sacks allowed in conference over three years. He was named the “Best Offensive Lineman” in state by Dave Campbell's Texas Football, and was a two-time Big 12 Commissioner's Honor Roll selection. He graduated in May 2016 with degree in communication studies.

Professional career

Houston Texans
Fuller was drafted by the Houston Texans in the seventh round with the 243rd overall pick in the 2017 NFL Draft. He played in nine games with two starts as a rookie.

On September 1, 2018, Fuller was waived by the Texans and was signed to the practice squad the next day.

Washington Redskins
On December 11, 2018, Fuller was signed by the Washington Redskins off the Texans practice squad. He was waived on April 30, 2019.

Miami Dolphins
On May 16, 2019, Fuller signed with the Miami Dolphins. He was released during final roster cuts on August 31, 2019.

Seattle Seahawks
On September 2, 2019, Fuller was signed to the Seattle Seahawks practice squad. On December 31, 2019, Fuller was promoted to the Seahawks active roster.

Fuller was suspended the first two games of the 2020 season for violating the NFL policy on substances of abuse. He was reinstated from suspension and activated to the roster on September 23, 2020.

Fuller signed an exclusive-rights free agent contract with the Seahawks on April 20, 2021.

Fuller re-signed with the Seahawks on March 18, 2022.

References

External links
Baylor Bears bio
Houston Texans bio

1994 births
Living people
American football centers
American football offensive guards
Baylor Bears football players
Houston Texans players
Miami Dolphins players
People from Duncanville, Texas
People from Wylie, Texas
Players of American football from Texas
Sportspeople from the Dallas–Fort Worth metroplex
Washington Redskins players
Seattle Seahawks players